The Wiek County ( or ,) was one of the four counties of the Russian Empire located in the Governorate of Estonia. It was situated in the western part of the governorate (in the northwestern part of present-day Estonia). Its capital was Haapsalu (Hapsal). The territory of Wiek County corresponds to the present-day Lääne and Hiiu counties, the westernmost part of Rapla County, and a small part of Pärnu County.

Demographics
At the time of the Russian Empire Census of 1897, Wiek County had a population of 82,077. Of these, 92.2% spoke Estonian, 5.6% Swedish, 1.2% German, 0.6% Russian, 0.2% Ukrainian, and 0.1% Latvian as their native language.

References

Wiek
Uezds of Estland Governorate